Dermogenys brachynotopterus, the Gangetic halfbeak, is a species of viviparous halfbeak belonging to the genus Dermogenys.

Distribution 
The Gangetic halfbeak is native to India and Bangladesh. It is found in the eastern Indian Ocean, and was first discovered in the Hooghly estuary in West Bengal, India. However, a further occurrence of the species has not been recorded since its original discovery.

Habitat and biology 
It is a pelagic species of fish, and inhabits the brackish waters of estuaries.

References 

brachynotopterus